George Theodore Mickelson (July 23, 1903 – February 28, 1965) was an American lawyer, 16th Attorney General of South Dakota and 18th Governor of South Dakota, and a United States district judge of the United States District Court for the District of South Dakota. He is the patriarch of the prominent Mickelson family of South Dakota.

Early life and education

George T. Mickelson was born near Selby in Walworth County, South Dakota, the son of Emma L. (Craig) and George M. Mickelson. His father was a Norwegian immigrant, and his maternal grandparents were German. Mickelson was the first Governor of South Dakota to be born in the twentieth century. Mickelson received a Bachelor of Laws from the University of South Dakota School of Law in 1927. He was a member of the Lambda Chi Alpha social fraternity.  He did not take the bar exam as he was admitted to the South Dakota bar under the state's diploma privilege. That year he returned to Selby to practice law. He married Madge Turner and they had four children.

Career

Prior to serving as governor, Mickelson, a Republican, served as State's Attorney for Walworth County from 1933 to 1936. He served in the South Dakota House of Representatives from 1937 to 1943 and was Speaker of the House in his last term.

He then served as South Dakota Attorney General from 1943 to 1947.

1942 Attorney General election

On May 9, 1942, Mickelson announced his candidacy for Attorney General.  On June 8, 1942, Mickelson won the nomination at the convention in a field of five candidates on the second vote with 110,090 votes; 31,359 votes for Harold O. Lovre of Hayti; 17,049 for William J Metzger of Olivet; 6,773 votes for Assistant Attorney General Erwin R. Erickson of Vermillion; and 1,610 votes for E.B. Adams of Hot Springs.

Mickelson defeated Democrat Lynn Fellows of Plankinton by a vote count of 108,155 to 62,527 votes.

1944 Attorney General election
On February 22, 1944, Mickelson declared that he would run for re-election.

On August 1, 1944, Fred Wheeler of Custer was unopposed and nominated for Attorney General at the Democratic Convention in Aberdeen.

Mickelson was re-elected defeating Democrat Wheeler by a count of 137,311 to 83,441 votes.

Gubernatorial elections
Mickelson became Governor of South Dakota in 1947, and served until 1951.

Presidential run

Mickelson ran as a favorite-son candidate in the 1952 South Dakota presidential primary, supporting Dwight D. Eisenhower's national bid, and lost narrowly to Eisenhower's chief rival, Senator Robert A. Taft of Ohio.

Federal judicial service

Mickelson received a recess appointment from President Dwight D. Eisenhower on December 9, 1953, to the United States District Court for the District of South Dakota, to a new seat authorized by 65 Stat. 710. He was nominated to the same position by President Eisenhower on January 11, 1954. He was confirmed by the United States Senate on February 9, 1954, and received his commission the next day. He served as Chief Judge from 1954 to 1965. He served until his death on February 28, 1965.

Notable clerk

Among Mickelson's judicial law clerks was Roger Leland Wollman.

Personal life

Mickelson is the patriarch of the prominent Mickelson family of South Dakota. Mickelson's son, George S. Mickelson, served as Governor of South Dakota from 1987 to 1993. They are the only father and son duo to serve in that office in the history of South Dakota. His grandson Mark Mickelson served as Speaker of the House of Representatives in the South Dakota State Legislature from 2017-18.

Death

Mickelson died February 28, 1965, and is buried in Woodlawn Cemetery in Sioux Falls, South Dakota.

Soon after his death the University of South Dakota named a new dormitory after him, George T. Mickelson Hall (better known as Mickelson Hall) opened in 1966.

References

External links
 
 
 The National Cyclopaedia of American Biography, Vol. 50 (New York: James T. White & Company)
 

1903 births
1965 deaths
American people of Norwegian descent
Republican Party governors of South Dakota
Judges of the United States District Court for the District of South Dakota
Speakers of the South Dakota House of Representatives
South Dakota Attorneys General
Republican Party members of the South Dakota House of Representatives
United States district court judges appointed by Dwight D. Eisenhower
20th-century American judges
Candidates in the 1952 United States presidential election
20th-century American politicians
People from Walworth County, South Dakota
University of South Dakota School of Law alumni
20th-century American lawyers